Anita Decker Breckenridge (born July 19, 1978) is an American political staffer who served in a number of positions in the administration of President Barack Obama. She was appointed White House Deputy Chief of Staff for Operations in March 2014, a position she took up in May 2014.

In January 2017, Breckenridge was named Chief of Staff for Barack Obama's post-presidency office. Her portfolio includes the Obama Foundation and Obama presidential library. She also oversees the presidential records process.

Early life 
Breckenridge was born and spent her early years in Kenilworth, Illinois. She graduated from New Trier High School in Winnetka, Illinois in 1996; while at high school she was an intern for US Senator Dick Durbin.
She studied political science at the University of Arizona, graduating in 2000.

Career 
She worked for Representative Lane Evans, and in 2003 moved to work for Obama, who was then a member of the Illinois Senate.  She ran all of Obama's Downstate Illinois offices when he was US Senator for the state, and managed the 2007 announcement of his candidacy for President.

After his election she served as Chief of Staff at the National Endowment for the Arts until May 2011, when she became personal secretary to the President, taking over from Katie Johnson.

In March 2014 the White House announced she would become Deputy Chief of Staff for Operations, replacing Alyssa Mastromonaco.

Personal life
She married political consultant Russell Breckenridge in 2010.

References

|-

Illinois Democrats
Living people
New Trier High School alumni
Obama administration personnel
People from Kenilworth, Illinois
University of Arizona alumni
White House Deputy Chiefs of Staff
Women government officials
1978 births